We're All Sailors (Spanish: Todos somos marineros) is a 2018 Peruvian-Dominican drama film written and directed by Miguel Angel Moulet in his directorial debut. It stars Andrey Sladkov and Ravil Sadreev.

Synopsis 
Three Russian sailors have found themselves stranded aboard a fishing trawler off the coast of Chimbote, a port city in Peru. The ship's owner's company has gone bankrupt, and the crew has abandoned the vessel, leaving Krystof, his younger brother, and the skipper without the resources to return home. The three men have been surviving as best they can by commuting between the ship and the port for their daily necessities, while awaiting their next course of action

Cast 
The actors participating in this film are:

 Andrey Sladkov as Tolya
 Ravil Sadreev as Vitya
 Julia Thays as Sonia
 Gonzalo Vargas Vilela as Tito
 Julia Thays
 Gonzalo Alejandro Vargas
 Beto Benites

Production

Financing 
In 2015, the film won the 2015 Production Contest Award from the Ministry of Culture (DAFO) and the 2016 Ibermedia-Co-Production Program Award, which provided them with enough budget to start filming the film.

Casting 
The casting was made up for the most part by non-professional actors of Russian origin.

Filming 
Principal photography began approximately June 2017 in Chimbote. Filming lasted 11 days inside the ship.

Release 
It had an initial premiere in August 2018 at the 22nd edition of the Lima Film Festival. The commercial premiere in Peruvian theaters was scheduled for February 6, 2020 but was delayed until February 20 of the same year.

Reception 
In its opening weekend, the film drew 660 viewers.

Awards

References

External links 

 

2018 films
2018 drama films
Peruvian drama films
Dominican Republic drama films
2010s Spanish-language films
2010s Russian-language films
2010s Peruvian films
Films set in Peru
Films shot in Peru
2018 directorial debut films